The National Football League Players Association, or NFLPA, is a labor union representing National Football League (NFL) players. The NFLPA, which has headquarters in Washington, D.C., is led by president J. C. Tretter and executive director DeMaurice Smith. Founded in 1956, the NFLPA is the second-oldest labor union of the four major professional sports leagues; it was established to provide players with formal representation to negotiate compensation and the terms of a collective bargaining agreement (CBA). The NFLPA is a member of the AFL–CIO, the largest federation of unions in the United States.

In the early years of the NFL, contractual negotiations took place between individual players, their agents, and management; team owners were reluctant to engage in collective bargaining. A series of strikes and lockouts have occurred throughout the union's existence largely due to monetary and benefit disputes between the players and the owners. League rules that punished players for playing in rival football leagues resulted in litigation; the success of such lawsuits impelled the NFL to negotiate some work rules and minimum payments with the NFLPA. However, the organization was not recognized by the NFL as the official bargaining agent for the players until 1968, when a CBA was signed. The most recent CBA negotiations took place in 2020.

In addition to conducting labor negotiations, the NFLPA represents and protects the rights of the players; the organization's actions include filing grievances against player discipline that it deems too severe. The union also ensures that the terms of the collective bargaining agreement are adhered to by the league and the teams. It negotiates and monitors retirement and insurance benefits and enhances and defends the image of players and their profession.

Background

The establishment of the National Football League in 1920 featured early franchises haphazardly formed and often saddled with financial difficulties, poor player talent and attendance rates. As the league expanded through the years, players were provided with no formal representation and received few, if any, benefits. In 1943, Roy Zimmerman's refusal to play an exhibition game without compensation resulted in his trade from the Washington Redskins to the Philadelphia Eagles. With the formation of the competing All-America Football Conference (AAFC) in 1946, NFL owners instituted a rule which banned a player for five years from NFL-associated employment if he left the league to join the AAFC.

Bill Radovich, an offensive lineman, was one player who "jumped" leagues; he played for the Detroit Lions in 1945 and then joined the Los Angeles Dons of the AAFC after the team offered him a greater salary. Subsequently, Radovich was blacklisted by the NFL and was denied a tryout with the NFL-affiliated San Francisco Seals baseball team of the Pacific Coast League. Unable to attain a job in either league, Radovich filed a lawsuit against the NFL in 1956. The case, Radovich v. National Football League, made its way to the United States Supreme Court in January 1957, with the court ruling that the NFL constituted a business under American antitrust law and did not enjoy the same immunity accorded to Major League Baseball. This ruling "set the foundation for a series of court battles" over compensation and employment conditions.

Initial organizing phase (1956–1967)

The NFLPA began when two players from the Cleveland Browns, Abe Gibron and Dante Lavelli, approached a lawyer and former Notre Dame football player, Creighton Miller, to help form an association to advocate for the players. Miller was initially reluctant but accepted in 1956. He contacted Don Shula (a Baltimore Colts player at the time), Joe Schmidt of the Detroit Lions, Frank Gifford and Sam Huff of the New York Giants, and Norm Van Brocklin of the Los Angeles Rams to aid in the development of the association.

By November 1956 a majority of the players signed cards allowing the NFLPA to represent them. Players for 11 of the 12 teams in the league voted to join the new association, with the Chicago Bears being the sole holdout.

An initial meeting was convened at the Waldorf-Astoria Hotel in November 1956 where players decided on demands to be submitted to league commissioner Bert Bell. One particularly sore point involved the lack of compensation for training camp and preseason exhibition games; while owners charged admission and benefitted from a lucrative series of preseason games, no contract payment was made until a player made a regular season roster. Players would work for up to eight weeks, risking season- or career-ending injury without pay.

The new association's initial agenda also included a league-wide minimum salary, plus a per diem when teams were on the road, a requirement that uniforms and equipment be paid for and maintained at the clubs' expense, and continued payment of salaries when players were injured. The NFLPA hoped to meet with Bell during the owners' meeting in January 1957 to discuss the demands; however, no meeting took place.

The owners, for their part, were immediately antagonistic to the concept of a player's union — a position epitomized when Miller, then an assistant coach with the Cleveland Browns, was removed from the team's annual photo at the insistence of head coach and general manager Paul Brown. Miller and other union founders were taken aback by Paul Brown's staunch view that "it was both just and necessary that management could cut, trade, bench, blackball, and own in perpetuity anyone and everyone that it wanted".

Miller continued to represent the NFLPA in their early days. Unable to win the owners' attention by forming the union, the NFLPA threatened to bring an antitrust lawsuit against the league. The antitrust laws are meant to protect "free and fair competition in the marketplace" and prohibit practices that may give industries or businesses an unfair advantage over their competitors.

Rather than face another lawsuit, the owners agreed to a league minimum salary of $5,000, $50 for each exhibition game played, and medical and hospital coverage. Although most of the NFLPA's requests were met, the owners did not enter into a collective bargaining agreement with the association or formally recognize it as the players' exclusive bargaining representative, instead agreeing to change the standard player contract and alter governing documents to reflect the deal.

From the inception of the NFLPA, its members were divided over whether it should act as a professional association or a union. Against the wishes of NFLPA presidents Pete Retzlaff and Bernie Parrish, Miller ran the association as a "'grievance committee'" rather than engaging in collective bargaining. The standard collective bargaining agreement (CBA) is a contract between organized workers and management that determines the wages and hours worked by employees and can also determine the scope of one's work and what benefits employees receive. The association continued to use the threat of antitrust litigation over the next few years as a lever to gain better benefits, including a pension plan and health insurance.

In the 1960s the NFL also faced competition from the new American Football League (AFL). NFL players viewed the new league as potential leverage for them to improve their contracts. The NFL tried to discourage this idea by changing the owner-controlled pension plan to add a provision saying that a player would lose his pension if he went to another league.

On January 14, 1964, players in the newer league formed the AFL Players Association, and elected linebacker Tom Addison of the Boston Patriots as president. Rather than working with the AFLPA, the NFLPA chose to remain apart and tried to block the merger between the two leagues in 1966, though lack of funding prevented it from mounting a formal challenge. With the merger complete, the players could no longer use the leverage of being able to sign with an AFL team to attain more money.

Parrish, upset with the ineffectiveness of the association, proposed forming a players' union, that would be independent of the NFLPA, with the assistance of the International Brotherhood of Teamsters (IBT). The IBT pushed for the NFLPA to join the trucking union. In early November 1967, Parrish, with support from former Cleveland Browns player Jim Brown, began distributing union cards to form a Teamsters affiliate known as the American Federation of Pro Athletes. The NFLPA rejected the overture at its meeting in Hollywood, Florida, during the first week of January 1968 and declared itself an independent union. Although Parrish's proposal was defeated, Miller left his position as counsel to the union. He was later replaced by two Chicago labor lawyers, Dan Schulman and Bernie Baum.

Recognition and certification (1968–1983)
Six months after the NFLPA declared itself an independent union, many players were dissatisfied with the lack of compensation teams provided and voted to strike on July 3, 1968, after official discussions with the owners stalled. The owners countered by declaring a lockout. By July 14, 1968, the brief work stoppage came to an end. Although a CBA resulted, many players felt that the agreement did not net them as many benefits as they had hoped. The owners agreed to contribute about $1.5 million to the pension fund with minimum salaries of $9,000 for rookies, $10,000 for veterans and $50 per exhibition game; there was at yet no neutral arbitration for disputes.

As the merger of the AFL and NFL became effective in 1970, the unions agreed to meet for the first time in January of that year. The NFL players wanted Ed Meador—who was the president-elect of the NFLPA prior to the merger—to become president of the newly combined association while the AFL players wanted Jack Kemp. The compromise was John Mackey of the Baltimore Colts, an NFL team before the merger, which was grouped with former AFL teams in the American Football Conference. The AFL players agreed to Mackey's election on the condition that former AFL player Alan Miller would become general counsel. Though the NFL owners were open to recognizing the union, their representatives requested lawyers not be present during negotiations, something the players were unwilling to agree to. This prompted the players to petition the National Labor Relations Board (NLRB) for union certification.

The NFLPA voted to strike on July 3, 1970 after having filed an unfair labor practices charge with the NLRB the previous month. The strike ended on August 3, just in time to avoid cancellation of preseason games. A new four-year CBA was reached after the owners threatened to cancel the season. With the new agreement, the union won the right for players to bargain through their own agents with the clubs, and minimum salaries were increased to $12,500 for rookies and $13,000 for veterans. Also, players' pensions were improved and dental care was added to the players' insurance plans. Players also gained the right to select representation on the league's retirement board and the right to impartial arbitration for injury grievances. Following the 1970 agreement, many union representatives were released by their teams. Unfazed, the players were determined to create a stronger union through better communication. Attorney Ed Garvey was hired by the NFLPA in 1971 to act as their first executive director, and the NFLPA became officially certified as a union by the NLRB the same year. Headquarters were established in Washington, D.C. and a campaign was launched to help inform players of their rights.

1974 strike
The NFLPA challenged the so-called "Rozelle Rule" as a violation of federal antitrust laws in a lawsuit filed by president John Mackey and allied union leaders in 1971. The rule, named after commissioner Pete Rozelle, allowed the commissioner to award compensation, which included players, to a team losing a free agent if both the signing team and the team the player was departing could not come to an agreement on compensation. This rule limited player movement, as few teams were willing to sign high-profile free agents only to risk having their rosters raided. With the 1970 CBA agreement set to expire, the players went on strike on July 1, 1974. In addition to the "Rozelle Rule", the players demanded the elimination of the option clause, impartial arbitration of disputes, elimination of the draft and waiver system and individual, rather than uniform contracts. The strike did not stop the 1974 preseason from going forward; the NFL used all-rookie squads as replacement players to play out the preseason schedule until the strike was resolved.

The strike lasted until August 10, 1974 when the players returned to training camp without a new CBA, instead choosing to pursue free agency through the Mackey lawsuit filed three years before. While the courts ruled in favor of the players in 1976, the union found that making progress in bargaining was more difficult to achieve. The Rozelle Rule was invalidated by the court which found it constituted a refusal to deal and was therefore in violation of the Sherman Act as it deterred franchises from signing free agents. However, the change did not achieve true free agency as compensation remained tied to draft picks that were awarded based on the salary of the departing free agent and teams still maintained a right of first refusal. The NFL and NFLPA agreed to a new collective bargaining agreement in March 1977 that ran until 1982.

1982 strike
The 1982 NFL strike began on Tuesday, September 21, and lasted 57 days, ending on November 16. During this time, no NFL games were played. The strike occurred because the union demanded that a wage scale based on percentage of gross revenues be implemented. The NFLPA wanted the percentage to be 55 percent, and according to the Los Angeles Times, this demand "dominated the negotiations."

During the strike, the NFLPA promoted two "AFC–NFC 'all-star' games." One was held at RFK Stadium in Washington, D.C., on October 17, and the second was held at the Los Angeles Memorial Coliseum a day later. One of the few stars who did play, future Hall of Fame running back John Riggins, explained "I guess I'll do just about anything for money." Despite a local TV blackout of WTBS and ticket prices starting at six dollars, neither game drew well; only 8,760 fans attended in Washington and 5,331 in Los Angeles. With no NFL games to air, CBS replayed the previous Super Bowl and aired Division III football; Pat Summerall and John Madden, for example, covered a game between Baldwin Wallace and Wittenberg. NBC acquired the rights to Canadian Football League games from ESPN, and both networks aired their respective games with NFL-like production values. However, the three CFL games NBC showed were all blowouts (by a total of 96 points) with poor ratings, and the network gave up.

The 1982 strike ended with a players' revolt against their own union, as some members suggested that Garvey step down as executive director. As a result of the strike, the season schedule was reduced from 16 games to 9 and the playoffs expanded the then-standard 10 to 16 teams (eight from each conference) for this one-season only "Super Bowl tournament." A new five-year agreement was ratified, providing severance packages to players upon retirement, an increase in salaries and post-season pay, and bonuses based on the number of years of experience in the league. Additionally, the NFLPA was allowed to receive copies of all player contracts.

Gene Upshaw era (1983–2008)
In 1983, former Oakland Raider Gene Upshaw became the executive director of the NFLPA. During his tenure, he oversaw a player strike, several antitrust lawsuits, and the collective bargaining agreement of 1993.

1987 strike

The NFLPA went on strike for a month in 1987 upon the expiration of the 1982 CBA; the league's free-agent policy was the major matter in dispute. This time, however, the strike only canceled one week of the season. For three weeks, the NFL staged games with hastily assembled replacement teams, made up principally of players cut during training camp and players left out of work from the closure of the United States Football League two years prior (along with, to a lesser extent, the Montreal Alouettes of the Canadian Football League (CFL), who had folded just three months prior to the strike). They were joined by a few veterans who crossed the picket lines, including New York Jets defensive end Mark Gastineau, Dallas Cowboys defensive tackle Randy White, San Francisco 49ers quarterback Joe Montana, New England Patriots quarterback Doug Flutie, and Seattle Seahawks wide receiver Steve Largent.

Given the willingness of the players to cross the picket lines and networks to broadcast the replacement games, despite a 20% drop in television viewership and even steeper drops in attendance, the union failed to achieve their demands. The strike ended on October 15, 1987, without a collective bargaining agreement in place. The union filed a new antitrust lawsuit on December 30 asking federal judge David Doty to overturn the league's restricting free agent policies.

On November 1, 1989, the Court of Appeals rejected the suit on the grounds that the owners were covered by the labor exemption from antitrust law. The union's next tactic, in November 1989, was to disclaim any interest in representing NFL players in collective bargaining and to reform itself as a professional organization. Having done that, individual players, led by Freeman McNeil of the New York Jets, brought a new antitrust action, challenging the NFL's so-called "Plan B" free agency, which gave teams a right of first refusal to sign a player, as an unlawful practice under the antitrust acts.

The players ultimately prevailed after a jury trial on their claims. That verdict, the pendency of other antitrust cases and the threat of a class action lawsuit filed by Reggie White, then with the Philadelphia Eagles, on behalf of all NFL players caused the parties to settle the antitrust cases and to agree on a formula that permitted free agency. In return, the owners received a salary cap, albeit one tied to a formula based on the players' share of total league revenues. The agreement also established a salary floor—minimum payrolls all teams were obliged to pay. The settlement was presented to and approved by Judge Doty, who had also heard the McNeil antitrust case in 1993. Once the agreement was approved, the NFLPA reconstituted itself as a labor union and entered into a new collective bargaining agreement with the league. The NFLPA and the league extended the 1993 agreement five times. The final extension came in March 2006 when it was extended through the 2010 season after the NFL owners voted 30–2 to accept the NFLPA's final proposal.

Financial Registration Program 
The NFLPA's Financial Registration Program was created in 2002 after a series of many investment schemes targeted at professional athletes. It aims to provide an extra layer of protection to athletes to protect them from fraud and poor advice, and provide players with advisors and agents who are pre-screened by the NFL.

DeMaurice Smith era (2009–present)

Following the death of Gene Upshaw in 2008, Richard Berthelsen was named interim executive director, serving from August 2008 until March 2009. The NFLPA Board of Representatives elected DeMaurice Smith for a three-year term as the executive director on March 16, 2009. Smith has been largely praised for his work ethic by the media, current and former players and colleagues as director and for making the union more professional despite the resentment of some players who found his leadership style to be too controlling. Smith's contract was renewed for an additional three years in March 2012. He was elected for a third term in March 2015. The major issue of Smith's tenure has been the 2011 lockout; former offensive lineman Chester Pitts praised Smith for fiercely fighting for the players' rights during negotiations.

2011 lockout

In May 2008, the owners decided to opt out of the 1993 arrangement, per the agreement with the players, with the termination to follow a year with no salary cap in 2010. By the CBA's expiration in March 2011, the NFLPA and the NFL had not yet come to terms on a new agreement. The owners were expected to lock out the players upon termination of the agreement. However, the NFLPA filed papers to decertify as a union on March 11, 2011, and filed an antitrust suit to enjoin the lockout with lead plaintiffs quarterbacks Tom Brady, Peyton Manning, and Drew Brees. U.S. District Court judge Susan Richard Nelson granted the players' request to end the owners' lockout on April 25. The league asked Nelson to stay the order while they appealed to the Eighth Circuit Court of Appeals; Nelson refused. On April 29, the Eighth Circuit granted the league a temporary stay of Nelson's ruling; the league reinstated the lockout the same day. The Eighth Circuit vacated Nelson's ruling on July 8, affirming the legitimacy of the lockout. During the lockout, players were barred from using team facilities and contacting team coaches; many organized their own workout regimens.

The parties settled the lawsuit on July 25, 2011, and a majority of players signed union authorization cards. The NFL officially recognized the NFLPA's status as the players' collective bargaining representative on July 30, 2011. The NFL and NFLPA proceeded to negotiate terms for a new collective bargaining agreement, and the agreement became effective after ratification by the players August 4, 2011. The agreement, which ran through 2021, stated that revenue sharing (the most contentious issue during the lockout) was re-designed so that the players must receive at least 47% of all revenue in salary for the term of the agreement. Additionally, a limit was placed on the amount of money given to rookies. $50,000,000 was set aside annually for medical research and approximately $1 billion would be set aside for retired player benefits over the life of the agreement.

Bountygate

The NFLPA, on behalf of Will Smith, Scott Fujita and Anthony Hargrove, three players suspended due to the Bountygate investigation by the NFL, filed a lawsuit against the league. The investigation found that New Orleans Saints players were allegedly paid bonuses for hits that injured opposing players. The players' lawsuit claimed NFL commissioner Roger Goodell "had violated the league's labor agreement by showing he had pre-determined the guilt of the players punished in the bounty probe before serving as the arbitrator for their June 18 appeal hearing". The suspensions were unanimously overturned by a three-member appeals panel; however, the ruling did not permanently void their suspensions. The NFL appointed former commissioner Paul Tagliabue to review the NFL's sanctions against the players, which he overturned.

New drug policy
The league and the NFLPA approved updated substance abuse and performance-enhancing substance policies in September 2014. The regulations include human growth hormone testing and amended rules on DUIs and marijuana. Third-party arbitration will handle appeals. The deal lifted suspensions for some players the week it was approved. The NFL began testing players for HGH the next month.

NFTs
On September 29, 2021, the league and the NFLPA agreed to authorize Dapper Labs to create digital video NFTs of the top plays in a season and also in league history. Previously, the league opted to ban individual teams from selling sponsorships to cryptocurrency trading firms or NFTs.

Composition

According to NFLPA's Department of Labor records since 2006, when membership classifications were first reported, around 60%, or almost two thirds, of the union's membership are classified as "former players," and not eligible to vote in the union, "because, as a matter of federal law, they cannot be members of the collective bargaining unit." The other, voting eligible, classifications are "active players" and "associates."  this accounts for 3,130 "former player" members (59% of total), 1,959 "active players" (37%), and 207 "associate" members (4%).

Leadership
The current president of the NFLPA is J. C. Tretter and the executive director is DeMaurice Smith. As of 2017, the executive committee consists of the following current and retired NFL players: Adam Vinatieri, Benjamin Watson, Lorenzo Alexander, Mark Herzlich, Richard Sherman, Sam Acho, Michael Thomas, Thomas Morstead, Russell Okung, and Zak DeOssie. Each NFL team also has a player representative, along with two to three alternate representatives.

See also
 NFLPA Collegiate Bowl
 National Football League Players Incorporated

Similar organizations
Major League Baseball Players Association
National Basketball Players Association
National Hockey League Players Association

References

Notes

Citations

Bibliography

Further reading
 1958 NFL Players Association Meeting Minutes
 Conflict and Compromise: The Evolution of American Professional Football's Labour Relations 1957-1966 by Michael E. Lomax

External links
 

 
Players Association
Labor relations in the United States
Players Association
Trade unions established in 1956
Sports trade unions of the United States
1956 establishments in the United States
Organizations based in Washington, D.C.
AFL–CIO